
Year 383 BC wasof the pre-Julian Roman calendar. At the time, it was known as the Year of the Tribunate of Poplicola, Capitolinu, Rufus, Flavus, Mamercinus and Trebonius (or, less frequently, year 371 Ab urbe condita). The denomination 383 BC for this year has been used since the early medieval period, when the Anno Domini calendar era became the prevalent method in Europe for naming years.

Events 
 By place 
 Greece 
 King Amyntas III of Macedon, forms a temporary alliance with the Chalcidian League, a confederation of cities of the Chalcidice peninsula, east of Macedonia. Sparta, whose policy is to keep Greeks disunited, sends an expedition northwards to disrupt the Chalcidian League.
 The Spartan commander Phoebidas, who is passing through Boeotia on campaign, takes advantage of civil strife within Thebes to gain entrance to the city for his troops. Once inside, he seizes the Cadmeia (the citadel of Thebes), and forces the anti-Spartan party to flee the city. The government of Thebes is placed in the hands of the pro-Spartan party, backed by a Spartan garrison based in the Cadmeia. Many of the previous leaders of Thebes are driven into exile. Epaminondas, although associated with the anti-Spartan faction, is allowed to remain.

 By topic 
 Astronomy 
 The 19 year lunar cycle is introduced into the Babylonian calendar.

 Religion 
 The second Buddhist council is convened by king Kalasoka and held at Vaisali.

Births

Deaths

References